The 1992 European Wrestling Championships were held in the men's Freestyle style in Kaposvár 1 – 3 May 1992; the Greco-Romane style in Copenhagen 24 – 27 April 1992.

Medal table

Medal summary

Men's freestyle

Men's Greco-Roman

References

External links
Fila's official championship website

Europe
W
W
European Wrestling Championships
Euro
Sports competitions in Copenhagen
1992 in European sport